Suderburg is a Samtgemeinde ("collective municipality") in the district of Uelzen, in Lower Saxony, Germany. Its seat is in the village Suderburg.

Samtgemeinde divisions 

The Samtgemeinde of Suderburg consists of 3 parishes with the following villages

Samtgemeinden in Lower Saxony
Uelzen (district)